Industrialisation (alternatively spelled industrialization) is the period of social and economic change that transforms a human group from an agrarian society into an industrial society. This involves an extensive re-organisation of an economy for the purpose of manufacturing. Historically industrialization is associated with increase of polluting industries heavily dependent on fossil fuels. With the increasing focus on sustainable development and green industrial policy practices, industrialization increasingly includes technological leapfrogging, with direct investment in more advanced, cleaner technologies.

The reorganization of the economy has many unintended consequences both economically and socially. As industrial workers' incomes rise, markets for consumer goods and services of all kinds tend to expand and provide a further stimulus to industrial investment and economic growth.  Moreover, family structures tend to shift as extended families tend to no longer live together in one household, location or place.

Background

The first transformation from an agricultural to an industrial economy is known as the Industrial Revolution and took place from the mid-18th to early 19th century. It began in Great Britain, spreading to Belgium, Switzerland, Germany, and France and eventually to other areas in Europe and North America. Characteristics of this early industrialisation were technological progress, a shift from rural work to industrial labor, and financial investments in new industrial structure. Later commentators have called this the First Industrial Revolution.

The "Second Industrial Revolution" labels the later changes that came about in the mid-19th century after the refinement of the steam engine, the invention of the internal combustion engine, the harnessing of electricity and the construction of canals, railways and electric-power lines. The invention of the assembly line gave this phase a boost.
Coal mines, steelworks, and textile factories replaced homes as the place of work.

By the end of the 20th century, East Asia had become one of the most recently industrialised regions of the world. The BRICS states (Brazil, Russia, India, China and South Africa) are undergoing the process of industrialisation.

There is considerable literature on the factors facilitating industrial modernisation and enterprise development.

Industrialisation in East Asia 
Between the early 1960s and 1990s, the Four Asian Tigers underwent rapid industrialisation and maintained exceptionally high growth rates.

Social consequences
The Industrial Revolution was accompanied with a great deal of changes on the social structure, the main change being a transition from farm work to factory related activities. This resulted in the creation of a class structure that differentiated the commoners from the well off and the working category. It distorted the family system as most people moved into cities and left the farm areas, consequently playing a major role in the transmission of diseases. The place of women in the society then shifted from being home cares to employed workers hence reducing the number of children per household. Furthermore industrialisation contributed to increased cases of child labor and thereafter education systems.

Urbanisation

As the Industrial Revolution was a shift from the agrarian society, people migrated from villages in search of jobs to places where factories were established. This shifting of rural people led to urbanization and increase in the population of towns. The concentration of labour in factories has increased urbanisation and the size of settlements, to serve and house the factory workers.

Exploitation

China 
China, along with many other areas of the world run by industrialisation, has been affected by the world's never ending rise of supply and demand. With the largest population in the world, China has become one of the main exporters of household items and appliances.

Changes in family structure
Family structure changes with industrialisation. Sociologist Talcott Parsons noted that in pre-industrial societies there is an extended family structure spanning many generations who probably remained in the same location for generations. In industrialised societies the nuclear family, consisting of only parents and their growing children, predominates. Families and children reaching adulthood are more mobile and tend to relocate to where jobs exist. Extended family bonds become more tenuous.

Current situation

 the "international development community" (World Bank, Organisation for Economic Co-operation and Development (OECD), many United Nations departments, FAO WHO ILO and UNESCO, endorses development policies like water purification or primary education and co-operation amongst third world communities. Some members of the economic communities do not consider contemporary industrialisation policies as being adequate to the global south (Third World countries) or beneficial in the longer term, with the perception that they may only create inefficient local industries unable to compete in the free-trade dominated political order which industrialisation has fostered. Environmentalism and Green politics may represent more visceral reactions to industrial growth. Nevertheless, repeated examples in history of apparently successful industrialisation (Britain, Soviet Union, South Korea, China, etc.) may make conventional industrialisation seem like an attractive or even natural path forward, especially as populations grow, consumerist expectations rise and agricultural opportunities diminish.

The relationships among economic growth, employment, and poverty reduction are complex. Higher productivity, it is argued, may lead to lower employment (see jobless recovery).
There are differences across sectors, whereby manufacturing is less able than the tertiary sector to accommodate both increased productivity and employment opportunities; more than 40% of the world's employees are "working poor", whose incomes fail to keep themselves and their families above the $2-a-day poverty line. There is also a phenomenon of deindustrialisation, as in the former USSR countries' transition to market economies, and the agriculture sector is often the key sector in absorbing the resultant unemployment.

See also

 Automation
 Deindustrialization
 Division of labour
 Great Divergence
 Idea of Progress
 Mass production
 Mechanization
 Newly industrialised country

References

Further reading

 Hewitt, T., Johnson, H. and Wield, D. (Eds) (1992) industrialisation and Development, Oxford University Press: Oxford.
 Hobsbawm, Eric (1962): The Age of Revolution. Abacus.
 Kemp, Tom (1993) Historical Patterns of Industrialisation, Longman: London. 
 Kiely, R (1998) industrialisation and Development: A comparative analysis, UCL Press:London.

 Pomeranz, Ken (2001)The Great Divergence: China, Europe and the Making of the Modern World Economy (Princeton Economic History of the Western World) by (Princeton University Press; New Ed edition, 2001)
 Tilly, Richard H.: Industrialization as an Historical Process, European History Online, Main: Institute of European History, 2010, retrieved: 29 February 2011.

External links
 

 
Secondary sector of the economy
Economic growth
Economic development
Late modern economic history
Industrial history